Ty Winter is a state representative from Las Animas County, Colorado. A Republican, Winter represents Colorado House of Representatives District 47, which includes all of Baca, Bent, Crowley, Kiowa, Las Animas, Otero, and Prowers counties and parts of Huerfano and Pueblo counties in southern Colorado. Some of the cities and towns in the district are Pueblo West, Trinidad, Lamar, La Junta, and Rocky Ford.

Background
Winter lives in Las Animas County and is a fourth-generation cattle rancher. He is also a business owner. From 2019 to 2022, he served as the chairman of his county's Republican party organization.

Elections
In the 2022 Colorado House of Representatives election, Winter defeated his Democratic Party opponent, winning 64.82% of the total votes cast.

References

External links
 Legislative website
 Campaign website

21st-century American politicians
Living people
Colorado Republicans
Ranchers from Colorado
People from Las Animas County, Colorado
Year of birth missing (living people)
Republican Party members of the Colorado House of Representatives